The Battle of the Eclipse (or Battle of Halys) was fought in the early 6th century BC in Anatolia (present-day Turkey) between the Medes and the Lydians. According to ancient Greek historian Herodotus, the battle was interrupted by "day turning into night" – presumably a solar eclipse – and the result was a draw which led to both parties negotiating a peace treaty and ending a six-year war.

Herodotus' account 

Herodotus writes that in the sixth year of the war, the Lydians and the Medes  were engaged in an indecisive battle when suddenly day turned into night, leading to both parties halting the fighting and negotiating a peace agreement. Herodotus also mentions that the loss of daylight had been predicted by Thales of Miletus. He does not, however, mention the location of the battle.

As part of the terms of the peace agreement, Alyattes's daughter Aryenis was married to Cyaxares's son Astyages, and the Halys River (present-day Kızılırmak River) was declared to be the border of the two warring nations.'

Modern interpretations 

If one reads the description by Herodotus of the event as a solar eclipse, then based on modern astronomical calculations it can be identified with the solar eclipse of May 28, 585 BC (known as Eclipse of Thales), hence yielding the exact date of the battle. For the location of the battle, some scholars assume the Halys River as it was located in the border region between both kingdoms. As Isaac Asimov notes, this would be the earliest recorded eclipse the date of which was accurately determined in advance of its occurrence.

However, such a reading is for a variety of reasons rather problematic and hence disputed by various scholars. For example, the known astronomical knowledge available of that time was not sufficient for Thales to predict the eclipse . Also, the eclipse would have occurred shortly before sunset at any plausible site of the battle, and it was very uncommon for battles to take place at that time of day. Furthermore, based on the list of Medean kings and their regnal lengths reported elsewhere by Herodotus, Cyaxares died 10 years before the eclipse.

An alternative theory regarding the date of the battle suggests that Herodotus was carelessly recounting events that he did not personally witness, and that furthermore the solar eclipse story is a misinterpretation of his text. According to this view, what happened could have been a lunar eclipse right before moonrise, at dusk. If the warriors had planned their battle activities expecting a full moon as in the previous few days, it would have been quite a shock to have dusk fall suddenly as an occluded moon rose. If this theory is correct, the battle's date would not be 585 BC (date given by Pliny based on date of solar eclipse), but possibly 3 September 609 BC or 4 July 587 BC, dates when such dusk-time lunar eclipses did occur.

Notes 

6th-century BC conflicts
Battles involving Lydia
Battles involving the Medes
6th century BC